The 2018 Americas Challenge was a curling challenge that took place from November 16 to 18 at the Chaska Curling Club in Chaska, Minnesota, United States.

This was the first time the Americas Challenge had three teams competing, with Guyana making their first appearance. The winner will be the second team from the Americas zone to qualify for the 2019 World Men's Curling Championship (Canada qualifies automatically as the host). The second-placed team will qualify for the 2019 World Qualification Event, a further chance to qualify for the men's world championship.

The United States went undefeated to qualify for the World Men's Curling Championship. Guyana's debut was a success, as while they lost both of their games to the US, they beat Brazil twice to secure second place and a spot in the World Qualification Event.

A women's event was scheduled with Brazil taking on the United States, but Brazil chose to concede, going straight to the 2019 World Qualification Event.

Format

The teams played a double round robin to determine the winner of the challenge. In the case of a tie, head-to-head score or shootout score will be used to determine the winner.

Teams

Standings

Results
All draw times are listed in Central Standard Time (UTC−06:00).

Game 1
Friday, November 16, 19:00

Game 2
Saturday, November 17, 09:00

Game 3
Saturday, November 17, 14:00

Game 4
Saturday, November 17, 19:00

Game 5
Sunday, November 18, 08:00

Game 6
Sunday, November 18, 13:00

References

Americas
Americas
Sports competitions in Minnesota
Americas
Curling in Minnesota
Chaska, Minnesota
International curling competitions hosted by the United States
Americas Challenge